The 2021 International Tennis Federation (ITF) Women's World Tennis Tour is the entry-level and mid-level tour for women's professional tennis. It is organized by the International Tennis Federation and is a tier below the Women's Tennis Association (WTA) Tour. The ITF Women's World Tennis Tour provides a professional pathway between the ITF Junior World Tennis Tour and the WTA Tour. The results of ITF tournaments are incorporated into the WTA ranking, which enables professionals to progress through to the elite levels of women's professional tennis. The ITF Women's World Tennis Tour offers approximately 500 tournaments across 65 countries and incorporates five prize money levels of tournaments: $15,000, $25,000, $60,000, $80,000 and $100,000

Tournaments at $15,000 level include reserved main draw places for Top-100 ranked ITF Juniors, providing a smooth pathway for the best new talent to break through into elite professional tennis. The ITF Women's World Tennis Tour is also designed to target prize money effectively to help reduce costs for players and ultimately enable more players to make a living.

Schedule

January–March

April–June

July–September

October–December

Participating host nations

Tournament breakdown by event category

WTA ranking points distribution 

 "+H" indicates that hospitality is provided.

Due to the COVID-19 disruption of the tour calendar resulting in a reduction of playing opportunities for players, the ITF and WTA decided to increase WTA ranking points earned in the categories W25 through to W80 for the remainder of the year.

 "+H" indicates that hospitality is provided.

Prize money distribution 

 All prize money in $USD
 Doubles prize money per team

Statistics

These tables present the number of singles (S) and doubles (D) titles won by each player and each nation during the season. The players/nations are sorted by: 
 Total number of titles (a doubles title won by two players representing the same nation counts as only one win for the nation) 
 A singles > doubles hierarchy
 Alphabetical order (by family names for players).

To avoid confusion and double counting, these tables should be updated only after all events of the week are completed.

Titles won by player

Titles won by nation

Retirements
Following is a list of notable players who announced their retirement from professional tennis, became inactive (after not playing for more than 52 weeks), or were permanently banned from playing, during the 2021 season:
  Georgia Brescia
  Montserrat González
  Romy Kölzer
  Mari Osaka
  Marina Yudanov

See also 
 2021 WTA Tour
 2021 WTA 125K series
 2021 ATP Challenger Tour
 2021 ITF Men's World Tennis Tour

References

External links 
 International Tennis Federation (ITF)

 
2021
2021 in women's tennis